This is a list of awards and nominations received by English film and theatre director Sam Mendes.

Mendes won the Academy Award for Best Director for the drama American Beauty (1999), and received three other Academy Award nominations for war epic 1917 (2019). He also received five British Academy Film Award nominations winning four awards for Skyfall (2012), and 1917 (2019). He also received two British Academy Television Award nominations for The Hollow Crown (2013, 2017). He also received four Golden Globe Award nominations winning three awards.

For his work in theatre on the West End, he received 11 Laurence Olivier Awards winning three awards. He also received two Tony Award nominations for his work on Broadway for Cabaret in 1998 and The Ferryman in 2019.

Major Associations

Academy Awards
The Academy Awards are a set of awards given annually for excellence of cinematic achievements. The awards, organized by the Academy of Motion Picture Arts and Sciences, were first held in 1929 at the Hollywood Roosevelt Hotel. Mendes has received one award from four nominations.

BAFTA Awards
The BAFTA Award is an annual award show presented by the British Academy of Film and Television Arts. The awards were founded in 1947 as The British Film Academy, by David Lean, Alexander Korda, Carol Reed, Charles Laughton, Roger Manvell and others. Mendes has received four awards from five nominations.

Golden Globe Awards
The Golden Globe Award is an accolade bestowed by the 93 members of the Hollywood Foreign Press Association (HFPA) recognizing excellence in film and television.  Mendes has received three awards from four nominations.

Olivier Awards
The Laurence Olivier Awards recognise outstanding achievements in plays and musicals performed in London's West End.

Tony Awards
The Antoinette Perry Award for Excellence in Theatre, more commonly known informally as the Tony Award, recognizes achievement in live Broadway theatre. The awards are presented by the American Theatre Wing and The Broadway League at an annual ceremony in New York City.

Guild Awards

Cinema of Peace Award

Directors Guild of America Award

Producers Guild of America Award

Writers Guild of America Award

Other associations

Belgian Film Critics Association

Britannia Award

Camerimage Film Festival

Critics' Choice Movie Awards

Critics' Circle Theatre Award

Drama Desk Award

Drama League Award

Directors Guild of Great Britain

Empire Awards

Evening Standard British Film Awards

Evening Standard Theatre Awards

Hollywood Film Awards

Jupiter Awards

London Film Critics' Circle

Los Angeles Film Critics Association

Outer Critics Circle Awards

Saturn Awards

ShoWest Convention

Toronto International Film Festival

Venice Film Festival

Washington D.C. Area Film Critics Association

Whats on Stage Award

Other awards

Notes

References

Mendes, Sam